Ganna Klymenko (born 27 February 1992 in Donetsk) is a Ukrainian competitor in synchronized swimming.

She won 3 bronze medals at the 2013 World Aquatics Championships and 2 silver medals at the 2012 European Aquatics Championships.

External links
 FINA profile

Living people
Ukrainian synchronized swimmers
1992 births
World Aquatics Championships medalists in synchronised swimming
Sportspeople from Donetsk
Synchronized swimmers at the 2013 World Aquatics Championships
Synchronized swimmers at the 2011 World Aquatics Championships
European Aquatics Championships medalists in synchronised swimming
21st-century Ukrainian women